Sparganium gramineum is a species of flowering plant belonging to the family Typhaceae.

Its native range is Norway to Japan.

References

gramineum